Acizzia is a genus of psyllids that primarily feed on Acacia and Albizia species. Many species are known from Australia and have become widespread as their host plants are popular garden specimens. Damage to the leaves is generally mild. Economic damage on plantation species is occasionally reported.

Acizzia are also known for their consumption of Mimosa.

References

External links 

Psyllidae
Psylloidea genera